Acronicta insita, the large gray dagger or fingered dagger, is a moth of the family Noctuidae. The species was first described by Augustus Radcliffe Grote in 1874. It is found from Newfoundland west to the Pacific coast and Vancouver Island and Haida Gwaii, British Columbia, south to North Carolina and Colorado.

Acronicta hesperida and Acronicta dactylina were formerly considered to be separate species, but are now considered a synonym.

The wingspan is 45–55 mm. Adults are on wing from May to July in one generation depending on the location.

The larvae feed on alder, birch, poplar, hawthorn and willow.

They have fine hairs that are actually hollow, containing a toxin within.  If direct contact is made through handling or even indirect contact through clothing, shaking a tree branch with a alder dagger caterpillar on it can result in exposure to these fine hairs.  Mild to severe rashes may appear for up to a week and may spread easily to other areas of the body through clothing rubbing on exposed area or scratching. Some people react more seriously while others have no reaction at all.  Applying strong adhesive tape to the area immediately after exposure may help to remove the fine hairs from your skin/clothes.

References

External links

Acronicta
Moths of North America
Moths described in 1874